The Australian Air Force Cadets (AAFC), known as the Air Training Corps (AIRTC) until 2001, is a Federal Government funded youth organisation. The parent force of the AAFC is the Royal Australian Air Force (RAAF). Along with the Australian Army Cadets (AAC) and the Australian Navy Cadets (ANC), it is part of the Australian Defence Force Cadets.

Aims
The broad aim of the Australian Air Force Cadets is to better equip young people for community life by fostering initiative, leadership, discipline, and loyalty through a training program designed to stimulate an interest in the Royal Australian Air Force. The training program is structured to reflect the following objectives:
 To give Cadets a foundation of Air Force knowledge and discipline;
 To develop the qualities of leadership, initiative, and self-reliance;
 To develop good character and good citizenship in the widest sense;
 To develop an interest in the Royal Australian Air Force and aviation generally;
 To instil a knowledge of the history of aviation; and
 To encourage Cadets to continue an active interest in aviation into their adult life.

AAFC activities

Cadets receive the opportunity to participate in a wide range of activities such as:

Home Training
 Bivouacs (Bush Camps)
 Firearms Safety Training 
 WTSS training shoots
 Gliding and Powered Air Experience and Training
 General Service Training Camps
 Personal Development and Leadership Courses (PDLC)
Parades and Marches – Drill and Ceremonial
 Unmanned Aerial Vehicles
 Rocketry
 Aeromodelling
National Competitions
International Air Cadet Exchange

Uniform 
The AAFC, for the past few decades, had been using various versions of the Disruptive Pattern Camouflage Uniform (now replaced) in combination with the DPCU camouflage rank slide with the letters "AAFC" highlighted in blue or white to indicate a cadet or staff member. The DPCU was the standard uniform worn on weekly parades.

The Air Force Blue (AFB) uniform is the uniform worn on ceremonial occasions. Instructor of Cadets (IOCs) and Officer of Cadets (OOCs) are permitted to wear their AFBs in combination with the RAAF Tunic or Dress Jacket if issued. A cadet may be issued with, or choose to purchase an SD Tunic under certain conditions. Cadet Under Officers and Cadet Warrant Officers may wear the RAAF Peaked Cap. The headdress worn by cadets and staff consists of the Hat Fur Felt - Khaki (HFF-K). Staff are also issued a RAAF peaked cap or RAAF Garrison Cap.

From early 2021, the AAFC started to roll out the General Purpose Uniform (GPU), the current issued uniform of the RAAF. Cadets and Staff members have been issued GPUs and a RAAF multi-purpose jacket to be worn optionally with their HFF-K or unit baseball cap. The AAFC stopped issuing the DPCU uniform from the start of 2021 in preparation to roll out the GPU. AAFC Personnel are issued their respective squadron patch, which typically contain a blue background with various symbols to represent the location that they are at and known for, with the exception of certain squadrons and flights.

Ranks
The ranks of the Australian Air Force Cadets (AAFC) are closely based on the ranks of the Royal Australian Air Force (RAAF). As such, a system of differentiation was required to distinguish members of the AAFC from those of the RAAF. This means that cadet ranks wear rank slides which are AFB (Air Force Blue) with an embroidered light blue ribbon, 1 cm wide at the base of the rank slide with 'AAFC' in AFB embroidery. Adult members of the AAFC wear rank slides with an embroidered white bar that contains the letters AAFC in place of the light blue bar. When DPCU uniforms became standard issue, cadets and cadet staff would wear surplus Australian RAAF and Australian Army Rank slides. These would be replaced in 2014 with the "AAFC" styled DPCU rank slide. Adult ranks are also followed by the letters AAFC (in brackets) when written, to distinguish them from actual members of the RAAF. Cadet Non-Commissioned Officer ranks are prefixed with the letter C, to identify them as cadets and not adult staff or members of the RAAF.

A new cadet is initially enrolled with the rank of Cadet and after completing prescribed training and length of service, they are eligible for reclassification to the rank of Leading Cadet. Subsequent promotions are achieved by completing two week training courses known as a promotion courses along with meeting time-in-rank and minimum age requirements and receiving a recommendation for promotion from the cadet's Commanding Officer.

 Recruit (RCT) is not an official rank, but commonly refers to new cadets who have been enrolled but have not yet finished "Recruit Stage" Training.

Cadet Ranks

Junior Cadet Ranks
Junior ranks comprise the ranks of Cadet (CDT) and Leading Cadet (LCDT) as well as the informal title of Recruit (RCT).

Cadets join the AAFC as recruits at the rank of Cadet (CDT) and commence Cadet Recruit Stage training which comprises the subjects Drill and Ceremonial, Service Knowledge, and Fieldcraft. Cadet Recruit Stage may include a teambuilding day or training day. Recruits receive their uniforms sometime during Cadet Recruit Stage. Cadet Recruit Stage usually takes 6 months to complete. The PH299 'blue book' (a form of identification carried at all times by cadets) has been replaced as the form of cadet & staff identification by a Photo ID card issued to all Cadets & Staff annually and using the Blue Book to record training and activities has been replaced by the online CadetNet system.

Upon completion of the Recruit Stage of training, CDTs begin Basic Stage. Basic Stage, on average, takes 6 months to fully complete. By completing Basic Stage, a cadet will begin Proficiency Stage and is eligible for reclassification to the rank of Leading Cadet (LCDT). A LCDT rank slide features a single inverted chevron.

Cadet Non-Commissioned Officer (CNCO) Ranks
Cadet Non-Commissioned Officer (NCO) ranks are Cadet Corporal (CCPL), Cadet Sergeant (CSGT), Cadet Flight Sergeant (CFSGT) and Cadet Warrant Officer (CWOFF).

Cadet Junior Non-Commissioned Officer (CJNCO) Ranks 
Any LCDT can apply for the Junior Non-Commissioned Officer Course. A cadet's Commanding Officer (CO) reviews the LCDT's application, and, if successful, endorses their application. This allows the LCDT to attend a Personal Development and Leadership Course (held during school holidays) conducted by their parent wing. The Junior Non-Commissioned Officer (JNCO) courses typically last for 4-7 days depending on wing, and are held at a RAAF base, depending on availability. At the end of a PDLC, the course commander grades the LCDT as either recommended or not recommended for promotion to the rank of CCPL. If recommended for promotion, a CO should promote the LCDT to the rank of CCPL as soon as practicable.

Cadet Senior Non-Commissioned Officer (CSNCO) Ranks 
Any CCPL can apply for the Senior Non-Commissioned Officer Course but must have held that rank for a minimum of six months before being able to attend the Personal Development and Leadership Course. They go through much the same process, though more rigorous, as do prospective JNCOs. SNCO courses typically last for 4-7 days depending on wing, and are also held at a RAAF base, often concurrently with a JNCO course.

Promotion is as for JNCOs. Having been recommended for promotion by the course commander, promotion is at the discretion of the CCPL's CO as soon as practicable.

After six months as a CSGT, a cadet may be promoted to the rank of CFSGT by their CO. This does not require the CSGT to attend a wing PDLC. Many COs require their prospective CFSGTs to demonstrate the ability to lead a team of SNCOs. Often Cadet Flight Sergeants are treated as 'executive' members of the Squadron and are given duties to match (activity planning, squadron organisation etc.), along with Cadet Warrant Officers and Cadet Under Officers; although they are still distinctly a Cadet Senior Non-Commissioned Officer.

Cadet Warrant Officers (CWOFF) and Cadet Under Officers (CUO) 
The ranks of CWOFF and CUO are the 2 most senior ranks due to the large increase of duties and privileges the two ranks have.

In order to attend a CWOFF course, a cadet must be an SNCO and have completed their JNCO course not later than 16 months before the commencement of the CWOFF course.

The CWOFF course generally lasts for 7-9 days depending on wing, and are conducted at a RAAF base, usually at the same time as CJNCO and CSNCO courses. CWOFF courses conducted by the AAFC primarily cover leadership and supervision, particularly focusing on the maintenance of morale, cadet welfare and, discipline. Due to the role of a CWOFF often being that of the Squadron Warrant Officer, the course has a significant weighting towards drill and ceremonial and service protocol.

Cadets promoted to the rank of CWOFF are addressed as Sir, Ma'am or Warrant Officer. Cadets, staff and defence personnel of a high rank generally will address the CWOFF by their rank and last name e.g. "Warrant Officer Bloggs", whilst subordinate ranks will address the CWOFF as "Sir or Ma'am" depending on their gender and, are too also allowed to address the CWOFF as "Warrant Officer Bloggs".

In order to attend a CUO course, a cadet must be an SNCO and have completed their JNCO course not later than 16 months before the commencement of the CUO course. CUO courses typically run for 7-9 days depending on wing, and are conducted at a RAAF base, usually in conjunction with CWOFF and other promotional courses. 

The rank of CUO is the highest attainable by a cadet and is designed to give the cadet experience in the role of an officer. To this end, the course is heavy in leadership and management-related subjects in addition to the drill required to be an officer.

CUOs are addressed by all cadets below their rank as Sir or Ma'am, as applicable, and are saluted.

Rank Establishments
The AAFC has specific rank establishments depending on the strength of a squadron. This is to ensure a balance between leadership roles and subordinates members (especially to prevent a top-heavy squadron developing). As an exaggerated example, it would not be beneficial for a squadron of 40 cadets to have 39 CUOs and 1 CDT, nor would it be beneficial for it to have 20 CWOFFs, 10 CFSGTs and 10 CSGTs. Rather, that squadron ought to have 2 CUOs, 2 CWOFFs, 1 CFSGT, 3 CSGTs, 5 CCPLs and around 30 LCDTs/CDTs. The general standard is 1–4 NCOs and CUOs, This is not a rule of the AAFC but is rather a recommendation made to units.
 Squadrons may not exceed the establishment for CUO and CWOFF positions. CUO positions do not cascade down to CWOFF positions if there are vacancies in the CUO numbers.
 Squadrons may use vacancies in CFSGT and CSGT positions to cascade down to lower ranks to permit COs the option to fill vacancies in SNCO ranks with JNCOs.
 Vacancies in rank cannot cascade upwards at any time.
 This means that vacant CCPL positions remain that way at all times, and, for example, a squadron with an establishment for 75 cadets that have only 3 CSGTs could not assign those positions to CUO/CWOFF/CFSGT rank but could assign them to allow for more CCPLs.
 Since the introduction of CadetNet as the AAFC's primary management system there is no limit imposed by CEA on rank establishments however the establishment is still followed by most COs.

Cadet Phases of Training
A cadet progresses through five phases of training during their cadet career.

Propeller refers to a round gold pin with a propeller-blade symbol printed in service blue, worn centrally of the right breast pocket flap above the button.

Staff Promotion

A person may be enrolled as an Instructor of Cadets (IOC) at the age of 18 and as an Officer of Cadets (OOC) at the age of 19, though most begin their career as an IOC.  However it is recommended that ex-cadets wait a minimum of 12 months before returning as a staff member.

Upon appointment as an IOC, the staff member is normally given the rank of AC/ACW(AAFC). Any new staff members who were a cadet and held the rank of Cadet Warrant Officer or Cadet Under Officer, within the last 5 years, are eligible for the rank of LAC/LACW(AAFC). Ex-ADF members may also be appointed at higher ranks than AC/ACW(AAFC), to recognise their previous rank/service in the ADF. Current ADF members may also be appointed at different ranks, as no member is permitted to have dual mess status (i.e. may only be permitted to eat/sleep in one of the Airmens' Mess, Sergeants' Mess or Officers' Mess).
 An ADF PTE(E)-CPL(E) can only be an AAFC AC(AAFC)-CPL(AAFC)
 An ADF SGT(E)-WO1(E) can only be an AAFC SGT(AAFC)-WOFF(AAFC)
 An ADF officer can only be an AAFC officer
 Since the ranks WOFF(AAFC), SQNLDR(AAFC), WGCDR(AAFC) and GPCAPT(AAFC) are not substantive ranks in the AAFC, senior airmen and senior/air officers may only be given the highest substantive rank of FSGT(AAFC) or FLTLT(AAFC) unless the member also holds a senior airmen/officer appointment.
AAFC staff members who join the ADF may have their rank changed to fit these criteria. This may include reversion in rank (e.g. PLTOFF or FSGT to CPL) or "promotion" (e.g. LAC or SGT to PLTOFF). The promotion to a commissioned officer rank is not automatic – the member is terminated as an instructor, and their application for an officer appointment is assessed. AAFC staff in the ADF do not need to have exactly the same rank in both the ADF and AAFC; their ranks are just required to adhere to the above criteria.

Promotion is less frequent than that of cadets, as there is no upper age limit for staff. The minimum time in rank requirements between promotions is three years, with the exception of promotion from AC/ACW(AAFC) to LAC/LACW(AAFC), LAC/LACW(AAFC) to CPL(AAFC) or from PLTOFF(AAFC) to FLGOFF(AAFC) in addition to other staff training requirements. The minimum time in rank requirement for AC/ACW(AAFC) to LAC/LACW(AAFC) is one year; from LAC/LACW(AAFC) to CPL(AAFC) is two years; and from PLTOFF(AAFC) to FLGOFF(AAFC) is two years; and from FLGOFF(AAFC) to FLTLT(AAFC) is three years.

Awards/Badges/Medals

Organisation

National Level

Headquarters
The AAFC organisation as a whole falls under the command of Headquarters AAFC (HQAAFC). HQAAFC has no physical location as it is made up of members from around the country. The only person to hold the rank of Group Captain (AAFC) (GPCAPT(AAFC)) is the Commander – Australian Air Force Cadets (CDR-AAFC). The CDR-AAFC reports to the Director General Cadets – Air Force, a member of the RAAF who holds the rank of Air Commodore, who reports to the RAAF chain of command.

Under HQAAFC are the Operational Wings and Directorates, each headed by a Wing Commander (WGCDR(AAFC)) who holds the appointment of Officer Commanding or Director respectively.
	

In 2015 the role of Warrant Officer of the AAFC was abandoned by a majority vote of National and Wing Executive. As a result of this more than 40% of AAFC staff, being Instructors of Cadets, are no longer represented at a national level by a staff member regarded as the most senior AAFC Instructor of Cadets. Airmen within the Wings are represented by the Wing Warrant Officer.

In late 2019 it was reported that the role of Warrant Officer of the AAFC was to be restored. However, as a result of COVID-19 restrictions, this did not occur.
In the interim several past Senior officers of cadets re-enlisted and were appointed at ranks that would enable them to qualify to submit an application for the role.

Directorates
Directorates perform a service support function to Operational Wings. As of 1 January 2019, there are 7 Directorates under the announced Headquarters AAFC restructure.

Cadets Branch – Air Force (CB-AF)

Cadets can join from when they are 12, ensuring they're turning 13 that year and must leave (age out) at the end of the calendar year they turn 18.

Operational Wings

	
Each year the Royal Australian Air Force awards the "Australian Air Force Cadets – Air Force Trophy". The winner of the Air Force Trophy is honoured with the custodianship of the AAFC National Banner for the following year.

Operational Units 
Each Wing contains a number of different units (squadrons (SQNs), and flights (FLTs)). Each unit is given a 3-digit number with the first digit representing their parent wing. For example, it can be told just by looking at the squadron number that 101 SQN is part of No. 1 Wing. Squadrons that have completed a Freedom of Entry parade have been granted permission to state their location when officially referring to their squadron. (E.g. No. 104 (City of Cairns) SQN).

Special Units 
In each wing, there are also special units that perform specialised duties such as aviation training, logistics, firearms training, and music.

The Aviation Operations Wing (sometimes unofficially referred to as "9 Wing") is a wing for aviation operations. Its flights fall under two categories: Gliding Training School (GTS) for gliding experiences and Elementary Flying Training School (EFTS) for powered flights. They are as follows:

Wing Cadet Reference Group

	
 Role of the Cadet Reference Group: The role of the CRG is to provide a forum where cadets within SQNs can provide feedback on matters that affect them and can receive information being passed down from OCs and COs. The CRG should contribute to the management decisions within its SQN and Wing by providing a cadets’ perspective to their CO or OC, through their nominated representative, when the leadership team is considering issues that directly impact on cadets.
 The Cadet Reference Group (CRG) is a cadet body within the Australian Air Force Cadets (AAFC) established to represent the views of AAFC Cadets to the strategic level of management.
 There should be two representatives from each Squadron (flights do not have any representatives), a Cadet Reference Group Representative (CRGREP) and an Assistant Cadet Reference Group Representative (ASSTCRGREP).
 Senior Cadets (CUO & CWOFF), and Cadet Senior Non-Commissioned Officers (CSNCO) – CWOFF, CFSGT & CSGT – will normally fulfil the CRGREP role for their Squadron whilst a CCPL to CDT would fulfill the ASSTCRGREP role.
 The Squadron CRGREPs & ASSTCRGREPs report to their Wing CRG Executive (Chairman Wing Cadet Reference Group [CWCRG] & Deputy chairman Wing Cadet Reference Group [DCWCRG]). 2 & 3 Wings are broken down into regions: North, South, West & Metro(3 Wing). In these regions CRGREPs & ASSTCRGREPs report to their respective Regional Representatives who in turn report to their Wing's CRG Executive.
 The Wing CRG chairman is responsible for providing representation to the management of the Wing by reporting to the Wing Officer Commanding, in some wings the CRG.

Command and structure
The AAFC organisation as a whole falls under the command of Headquarters AAFC (HQAAFC). HQAAFC has no physical location as it is made up of members from around the country. The only person to hold the rank of Group Captain (AAFC) is the Commander of the Australian Air Force Cadets (CDR-AAFC). The CDR-AAFC reports to the Director General Cadets – Air Force, a member of the RAAF who holds the rank of Air Commodore, and in turn reports to the RAAF chain of command.
 	
Under HQAAFC are the Operational Wings and Directorates, each headed by a WGCDR(AAFC) who holds the appointment of Officer Commanding (OC) or Director respectively. Cadet squadrons only exist within the Operational Wings. They report to the Operational Wing Officer Commanding (often through an Executive Officer) and are commanded by a Commanding Officer. A squadron Commanding Officer (CO) will hold the rank of PLTOFF(AAFC), FLGOFF(AAFC) or FLTLT(AAFC) unless the officer holds another appointment which entitles them to a more senior rank, some squadrons are commanded by a WOFF(AAFC).
	
There are 8 Operational Wings for all states and territories, however, the state of Queensland is divided into two Wings. There are also eight directorates to serve a support function for operational wings: Aviation Operations Directorate (AOD), Corporate Services Directorate (CSD), Diversity Directorate (DIVD), People and Culture Directorate (PCD), Operations Directorate (OPSD), Safety Directorate (SAFD), Training Directorate (TD).

As of 1 April 2005, a Squadron's establishment no longer justifies a CO to hold the rank of SQNLDR(AAFC) rank. However, it is still possible to have a CO of SQNLDR(AAFC) or even WGCDR(AAFC) rank, but only if that CO holds a wing or national position e.g. Officer Commanding, Director, Staff Officer or deputy director position in Wing or National HQ in addition to their appointment as a Squadron CO.
 	
There are a number of key appointments within Wing Headquarters, including;
 	

 	
There are also a large number of other positions such as Administration Officer, Psychologist, Chaplain and various other training and administrative appointments. Larger Wings may have more executive and other appointments.
 	
Each Wing has an Air Force Liaison Officer (AFLO), a RAAF officer (often a reservist) who is responsible for all activities requiring RAAF support for that region, amongst other duties.
 	
Airmen/women and junior officers are posted to an individual squadron (as per a squadron's size) as instructors of cadets (IOC) and officers of cadets (OOC).

The AAFC incorporates a National Cadet Reference Group, comprising eight Wing Chairs under the direction and leadership of a Chairman of the NCRG and Deputy Chairman of the NCRG. This is the peak representative and advisory body acting on behalf of the cadets to the higher echelons of the organisation. The chairman is a default member of several groups through virtue of their appointment including the tri-service Cadet Consultative Forum, the AAFC Executive Council and the National Council among others.

AAFC Home Training
There are five stages of AAFC Home Training, each Training Stage has a number of subjects.

Cadet Recruit stage
This training stage is designed to give cadets fundamental knowledge required to participate in AAFC Home Parades and Activities. The course should take between two and six months and should include at least one day of training.

Subjects in the Cadet Recruit Stage include drill, team building, and fieldcraft.

Basic stage
This training stage is designed to take a cadet with fundamental knowledge and build on this to the point where the cadet is proficient at most basic activities. Completion of this stage also makes cadets eligible for reclassification to the rank of Leading Cadet.
	
Subjects in Basic Stage include aircraft recognition, drill, and fieldcraft.

Proficiency Stage
This training stage is designed to be completed one year. Proficiency Stage comprises three compulsory core subjects and three elective subjects.
 	
Subjects in Proficiency Stage include drill, aircraft recognition, fieldcraft, and survival skills.

Advanced Stage
This stage of training is designed to provide cadets with extensive knowledge about the RAAF and the AAFC. Advanced Stage comprises three compulsory core subjects plus three other subjects.

Qualified Stage
To complete Qualified Stage cadets are to complete a mix of Projects and Elective subjects. The mix of electives and projects may be:
 
Qualified Stage cadets who have Squadron duties such as instructing, administration, or supervising junior cadets may have these duties recognised in lieu of elective subjects in the form of a generic subject labelled Squadron Management Elective.
	
Projects are substantial multi-media presentations that may be individual or team efforts. Projects should be relevant to ADF or AAFC themes.

Electives
Electives subjects include personal development, adventure training, aviation recognition, aircraft modelling, air navigation, air traffic control, field operations, fire safety, firearms training, life saving, meteorology, engineering, model rocketry, and radio communications.

AAFC RAAF Base Training 
Every cadet that shows potential may apply for training held on active military bases.

General Service Training Camps (GST) 
GST training is a seven-day course that allows cadets to learn the basics of the RAAF and experience minor military training. This course primarily contains experience training at different RAAF units and lets cadets get a small understanding of what life in the RAAF is like.

Cadet Flying Training (CFT) 
CFT is conducted on powered aircraft and can be held either on civilian or military-owned airfields and is usually held for two to three weeks. An example includes Elementary Flying Training School, which is held at a RAAF Base, such as RAAF Base Amberley on the Diamond DA40NG. These Cadets are trained on a variety of aircraft and are taught the basics of flight. They are trained to complete a solo circuit by the end of the course.

Personal Development and Leadership Courses 
During these courses, cadets are taught the qualities required of the rank they are attaining to. These courses vary and can be held in a multitude of military bases within Australia including Borneo Barracks, RAAF Base Amberley, RAAF Base Townsville, RAAF Base Williams Laverton, RAAF Base Richmond, RAAF Base Wagga, and RAAF Base Edinburgh.

Drill and Ceremonial
AAFC training constitutes much Drill and Ceremonial training, ranging from basic static drill in recruit phase to advanced banner, Rifle and sword drill on officer courses. Each parade night a "squadron daily parade" is held (daily for RAAF SQNs, weekly for AAFC SQNs) in which all cadets participate, with CNCOs and above assuming executive position of Flight Sergeant (CCPL), Flight Commander (CSGT/CFSGT), Parade Warrant Officer (CWOFF), Parade Commander (CUO) and often Reviewing Officer (CUO). Lower ranks may hold these positions where there are insufficient senior cadets. Squadrons also hold CO's Parades (usually once a month but not always) where staff go on parade and the squadron is inspected by the Commanding Officer.
	
AAFC squadrons often form guards and banner parties at Anzac/Remembrance Day/Victory in the Pacific Day/Vietnam Veterans Day services and other cadets will march on these parades. Promotion course graduation parades are very significant events, often requiring days of training. These parades will often be reviewed by a senior RAAF officer and consist of several squadrons/flights as well as colour parties. Graduation parades will generally be armed (usually SNCO candidates, but can consist of lower and higher ranks in some cases) with Lee Enfields,  L1a1 rifles, or F88 Austeyrs, the Standard Individual Weapon of the Australian Defence Force (often issued the F88I submodel – meaning innocuous and older variants of F88) and swords for executives. Colour party members are often temporarily issued ceremonial equipment such as White cotton gloves, Banner Girdle (for Banner/Colour Bearer) or Sash (Banner/Colour Warrant Officer) and white belts.

Major Activities

National Competitions
HQAAFC holds three National Competitions throughout the year, they are:

 National Fieldcraft Competition (NFCC) – Held annually at various locations (such as Puckapunyal Training Area in Victoria (Australia), or Majura Training Area in the Australian Capital Territory).
 National Rifle Competition (NRC) – Held in September each year at various locations (such as Sydney International Shooting Centre).
 National Aviation Competition (NAC) – (formerly known as NATFLY) Held in December (previously October) of each year on RAAF Bases around the country, both Power and Gliding competitions take place.

Wing Competitions 
Wings may also hold their own competitions throughout the year and are similar to national competitions. This can include Drill Competitions, Unmanned Aerial Vehicle (UAV) competitions and a shooting competitions.

International Air Cadet Exchange (IACE)

The International Air Cadet Exchange (IACE) Program came into being in 1947 when Canada and the UK arranged a bi-lateral exchange of air cadets between the two countries.

The AAFC currently exchanges with the following countries:
 United States
 Canada	
 United Kingdom	
 Hong Kong	
 Singapore	
 New Zealand	
 France	
 Republic of Korea (second year)
 Netherlands

Minor Activities

Airshows 
Cadets are given the ability to appear at local airshows and military expos depending on location of the unit. For Example, 6 Wing (South Australia) sent many cadets to attend the 2019 Edinburgh Air Show. Cadets can take up roles such as assistance to security and catering.

Charities 
Cadets assist local communities by holding and assisting in charity events, one such event including Relay for Life. These also consist of donations to military support organisations such as Legacy. Sometimes Senior Cadets plan these events.

Bivouacs 
AAFC units commonly partake in camping activities called 'bivouacs' and allow cadets to learn fieldcraft, leadership and teamwork prior to a promotional course. These can last from a weekend to a week.

Memorials
Australia has two memorials to the Australian Air Force Cadets. The first occupies a prominent position on the grounds of St John's Ashfield, and a memorial service attended by the Cadets has been held annually since it was opened by the State Governor Lieutenant General John Northcott in 1946. It was built by Squadron Leader Arthur Whitehurst who had commanded a squadron at Ashfield during the period 1941–1946, and whose son Douglas Arthur Whitehurst had died in action in World War II.

The second is a plaque unveiled in 1981 as part of a commemoration parade on the fortieth anniversary of the Australian Air Force Cadets' predecessor the Air Training Corps. The plaque is located at the base of a tree adjacent to the south west path leading from the Shrine of Remembrance in Melbourne, Victoria.

Each Cadet Squadron has an association with a local Returned and Services League (RSL) branch and Squadrons participate in local ceremonies such as ANZAC & Remembrance Day Marches with their RSL Branch.

Firearms

Currently in use 

Cz452
Cz453
Cz455
ZKM 452
F88 (Only used in ceremonial activities)

Formerly used 

 Lee Enfield (retired 2011) (Still used during military drill)
 Martini Cadet (retired in the 1970s)
 L1a1 (retired 2013) (Still used during drill)

Aircraft and Gliders

Powered Fixed Wing Aircraft

Past Powered Fixed-Wing Aircraft

Gliders

Past Gliders

See also

 Air League Cadets

Other Australian Defence Force Cadets
 Australian Army Cadets
 Australian Navy Cadets
 Australian Defence Force Cadets

Other Air Cadet organizations
 Air Training Corps (UK)
 Civil Air Patrol
 New Zealand Air Training Corps
 Royal Canadian Air Cadets

References

Bibliography
 Cadet Forces Regulations
Glozier, Matthew. 75 Years Aloft: Australian Air Force Cadets (Royal Australian Air Force Air Training Corps), 1941-2016. Canberra, 2016.

External links

 
 Resource Centre, Australian Air Force Cadets Intranet
 International Air Cadet Exchange Official website

 
Australian military aviation
Youth organisations based in Australia